The Michael Roach Medal is an Australian rules football award given each season to the leading goalkicker (or goalkickers) for the Richmond Football Club.

The award is now named in honour of Michael Roach, Richmond's "best post-war full forward". Roach won the goalkicking award at Richmond on seven occasions; in 1980 kicked the highest individual season goal tally in Tiger history and became only the second Richmond full forward to kick over 100 goals in a season; and was the first Richmond player to win the VFL/AFL goalkicking award twice (Jack Riewoldt winning it for the second time in 2012).

Richmond's best pre-war full forward, Jack Titus, led the goalkicking at Richmond on eleven occasions. Retiring in 2009, Richmond forward Matthew Richardson was the club's leading goalkicker on thirteen occasions.

Former Richmond captain Jeff Hogg won the award five times, while and Kevin Bartlett has won the award four times. Jack Riewoldt has won the award eleven times and has won the Coleman Medal a club record three times. A number of players were the club's leading goalkicker for the season on three occasions – George Bayliss, Doug Strang, Dick Harris, Ray Poulter, Bob Dummett, Ted Langridge.

Recipients

AFL Women's

Multiple Winners

References

External links 
 Richmond Honour Roll at Footystats

Australian Football League awards
Richmond Football Club
Australian rules football-related lists
Melbourne sport-related lists